The Irishtown Stadium is an association football stadium in the Republic of Ireland based in Ringsend/Irishtown, Dublin. It was originally built in the 1950s and used as a home ground by Shelbourne F.C. However Shels only spent one season, 1955–56, playing competitive first-team matches there. The stadium was renovated in 2004 through funding provided by the city council along with Dublin Docklands Development Authority and the National Lottery, and is now managed by Dublin City Council. Irishtown Stadium features a pavilion which contains a fully equipped gymnasium, an aerobics studio and meeting rooms. There are also track and field facilities, including a 400m running track and long jump pits. Association football facilities include five floodlit, all-weather five-a-side football pitches and a full-sized UEFA–standard astropitch. Its regular tenants/users include two association football clubs – St. Patrick's C.Y.F.C. and Liffey Wanderers F.C.  – that play in the Leinster Senior League and Crusaders Athletics Club.

References

Irishtown
Irishtown, Dublin
Association football venues in the Republic of Ireland
Sports venues in Dublin (city)
Athletics (track and field) venues in the Republic of Ireland
Association football venues in County Dublin
1950s establishments in Ireland
Sports venues completed in the 1950s